Jellyfish is a 2018 British social-realist film.  The film stars Liv Hill, Sinead Matthews and Cyril Nri.

Plot
Sarah is a teenage carer to a mother with mental health issues and two younger children, holding the family together by various means including financially by a part-time job.  The film develops increasing pressures with caring, school and work on Sarah; who resorts to increasingly desperate measures to juggle conflicting requirements.  Her drama teacher's end-of-school showcase as the film’s climax leads her to choose between life as a family carer and her newly discovered stand-up comedy talent.

Cast 
Liv Hill as Sarah Taylor

Sinead Matthews as Karen Taylor

Cyril Nri as Adam Hale

Angus Barnett as Vince

Production
The film features and was predominantly shot in and around Margate, Kent.

Release
Jellyfish premiered at the 2018 Tribeca Film Festival.

Accolades
Hill and Matthews jointly won the Best Performance in a British Feature Film award at the 2018 Edinburgh Film Festival.

References

External links
 

2018 directorial debut films
2018 films
British drama films
Films shot in Kent
Margate
2010s English-language films
2010s British films